Manuel Gonzalez (born 14 September 1957) is a sailor from Chile, who represented his country at the 1984 Summer Olympics in Los Angeles, United States as crew member in the Soling. With helmsman Louis Herman and fellow crew member Jorge Zvazola they took the 16th place. With helmsman Germán Schacht and fellow crew member Rodrigo Zvazola Gonzalez took 20th place during the 1988 Summer Olympics in Busan, South Korea.

References

Living people
1957 births
Sailors at the 1984 Summer Olympics – Soling
Sailors at the 1988 Summer Olympics – Soling
Olympic sailors of Chile
Chilean male sailors (sport)